Sibin Slavković (b. 1953, Žunjevići, Yugoslavia) is a Serbian comic book artist, illustrator and editor.

Professional career 
Since making a debut in Politikin zabavnik in 1973, Slavković worked as a comic book writer and artist for major Yugoslav publishers such as Dečje novine, Dnevnik and Forum, often in collaboration with Branislav Kerac and Svetozar Obradović.  His credits include licensed titles such as Tarzan, Il Grande Blek and Ninja. In the 1990s Slavković turned to foreign publishers, doing the coloring work for Joe Kubert and Hermann Huppen. His comics have been published in the US, France, Germany, Scandinavia and former Yugoslavia. He was the editor of seminal publications such as YU strip (1979-1983) and Stripoteka (1999-2016).

Personal life 
Sibin Slavković was born in Žunjevići (Yugoslavia, presently Serbia). His family moved to Starčevo when he was six. His brothers are both painters. Slavković fell in love with comics reading Radivoj Bogičević's Akant and Arturo del Castillo's Larrigan. He has lived with his family in Novi Sad since 1983.

Bibliography

Artist 
 Il Grande Blek
 Tarzan
 Ninja
 The Mask: Toys in the Attic
 Stormy & Iceberg

Colorist 
 Tex
 Docteur Mystère
 Abraham Stone: The Revolution
 Comanche: The Prisoner
 Just Imagine Stan Lee Creating Batman

References 

Serbian comics artists
Serbian editors
Artists from Novi Sad
1953 births
Living people